Below is a complete list of the operas performed by The Santa Fe Opera (Santa Fe, New Mexico) since its inception in 1957.  Only complete operas presented on stage with orchestra are listed.  However,  over the years, the company has also highlighted programs of opera scenes and one-act operas which showcase programs presented by the Apprentice Singers and Apprentice Technicians.

Nearly all the performances listed took place in the three main theatres: the original theatre (1957–67, with the exception of those which took place in the Sweeney Opera House after the July 1967 fire), the rebuilt theatre (1968–1997), and the present Crosby Theatre (since 1998).

To date, The Santa Fe Opera has been led by the following General Directors:
1957–2000: John Crosby; 2000–2008: Richard Gaddes; 2008–2018: Charles MacKay; 2018–present: Robert Meya

List

The first theatre, 1957 to 1967

The second theatre, 1968 to 1997

The Crosby Theatre from 1998
The theatre was named for John Crosby as well as his parents after John Crosby's death in 2002.
{| class="wikitable sortable"
!Year!!|Opera!!|Composer!!|Lang.!!|Year|
!Conductor
!Stage director
!Designers
!class="unsortable"|Notable singers
|-
|1998 || Madame Butterfly || Giacomo Puccini || Italian || 1904 || John Crosby || John Copley || Bruno Schwengl,Michael Stennett,Duane Schuler || Miriam Gauci,Martin Thompson,Peter Coleman-Wright / Richard Stilwell,Judith Christin
|-
|1998 || The Magic Flute || Wolfgang Amadeus Mozart || German || 1791 || Robert Spano || || Roni Toren,Judy Levin,Duane Schuler || Raymond Very,Heidi Grant Murphy,Thomas Barrett,Jami Rogers /Cyndia Sieden,Ryland Davies,Stephen Richardson
|-
|1998 || Béatrice et Bénédict || Hector Berlioz || French || 1862 || Edo de Waart || Tim Albery || Antony McDonald,Antony McDonald,Jennifer Tipton || Susan Graham,Gordon Gietz,Ronn Carroll,Elizabeth Futral,Nathan Gunn
|-
|1998 || Salome || Richard Strauss || German || 1905 || John Crosby || Ken Cazan || Tom Hennes,Martin Pakledinaz,Amy Appleyard || Helen Field,Kenneth Riegel,Anne-Marie Owens,Claudio Otelli
|-
|1998 || A Dream Play || Ingvar Lidholm || Swedish || 1992 || Hal France || Colin Graham || Derek McLane,David C. Woolard,Amy Appleyard || Sylvia McNair,Richard Stilwell,Ragnar Ulfung,Håkan Hagegård
|-
|1999 || Countess Mariza || Emmerich Kálmán || German || 1924 || John Crosby || Daniel Pelzig || Maxine Willi Klein,Dona Granata,Duane Schuler || Sheri Greenawald,Tamara Acosta,Ryland Davies,Kevin Anderson
|-
|1999 || Idomeneo || Wolfgang Amadeus Mozart || Italian || 1781 || Kenneth Montgomery || John Copley || John Conklin,Johann Stegmeir,Duane Schuler  || Jerry Hadley,Catrin Wyn-Davies,Gordon Gietz,Janice Watson
|-
|1999 || Ariadne auf Naxos || Richard Strauss || German || 1916 || John Crosby || Bruce Donnell || Kevin Rupnik,Mimi Maxmen /Kevin Rupnik,Daniel Murray || Christine Brewer,Elizabeth Futral,Nathan Gunn,Richard Stilwell
|-
|1999 || Dialogues of the Carmelites || Francis Poulenc || German || 1957 || Stephane Deneve || Francesca Zambello || unk.,Alison Chitty,Alison Chitty || Christine Goerke,Patricia Racette,Sheila Nadler,Richard Stilwell
|-
|1999 || Carmen || Francis Poulenc || French || 1874 || || || ||
|-
|2000 || Rigoletto || Giuseppe Verdi || Italian || 1851 || Richard Buckley || Mikael Melbye || Mikael Melbye,Zack Brown,Duane Schuler || Kim Josephson,Martin Thompson /Paul Charles Clarke,Elizabeth Futral,Beth Clayton
|-
|2000 || The Marriage of Figaro || Wolfgang Amadeus Mozart || Italian || 1786 || Kenneth Montgomery || Thor Steingraber || Robert Perdziola,Robert Perdziola,Duane Schuler || John Relyea,Catrin Wyn-Davies,Joyce DiDonato,Jochen Schmeckenbecher
|-
|2000 || Ermione || Gioachino Rossini || Italian || 1819 || Robert Tweten /Evelilno Pido || Jonathan Miller || Isabella Bywater,Isabella Bywater,Duane Schuler || Alex Penda,Gregory Kunde,Barry Banks,Celena Shafer
|-
|2000 || Elektra || Richard Strauss || German || 1921 || John Crosby || John Copley || Bruno Schwengl,Bruno Schwengl,Adam Silverman || Mary Jane Johnson,Susan B. Anthony,Greer Grimsley,Ragnar Ulfung
|-
|2000 || Venus und Adonis || Hans Werner Henze || German || 1997 || Richard Bradshaw || Alfred Kirchner || John Conklin,David C. Woolard,Jennifer Tipton || Lauren Flanigan,Stephen West,John Daszak
|-
|2001 || Lucia di Lammermoor || Gaetano Donizetti || Italian || 1835 || Richard Buckley || Thor Steingraber || Dipu Gupta,Joel Berlin,Duane Schuler || Alexandra von der Weth,Oziel Garza-Ornelas,Jeffrey Wells,Frank Lopardo,Richard Crawley
|-
|2001 || Falstaff || Giuseppe Verdi || Italian || 1893 || Alan Gilbert || Jonathan Miller || Robert Israel,Clare Mitchell,Duane Schuler || Andrew Shore,Anthony Laciura,Wilbur Pauley,Judith Christin,Alwyn Mellor,Jill Grove,Danielle de Niese
|-
|2001 || Mitridate || Wolfgang Amadeus Mozart || Italian || 1770 || Kenneth Montgomery || Francisco Negrin || Anthony Baker,Anthony Baker,Allen Hahn || Donald Kaasch,Laura Aiken,Bejun Mehta,Celena Shafer
|-
|2001 || The Egyptian Helen || Richard Strauss || German || 1928 || John Crosby || Bruce Donnell || Adam Stockhausen,Adam Stockhausen,Rick Fisher || Christine Brewer,Judith Howarth,Jill Grove,Mark Delavan
|-
|2001 || Wozzeck || Alban Berg || German || 1931 || Vladimir Jurowski || Daniel Slater || Robert I. Hopkins,Robert I. Hopkins,Rick Fisher || Anthony Laciura,Anne Schwanewilms,Håkan HagegårdRagnar Ulfung
|-
|2002 || Eugene Onegin || Pyotr Ilyich Tchaikovsky || French || 1879 || Alan Gilbert || Jonathan Miller || Isabella Bywater,Isabella Bywater,Duane Schuler || Scott Hendricks,Patricia Racette,Kurt Streit,Rod Gilfry,Valerian Ruminski /Eric Halfvarson
|-
|2002 || The Italian Girl in Algiers || Gioachino Rossini || Italian || 1813 || Darik Knutsen || Edward Hastings || Robert Innes Hopkins,David C. Woolard,Duane Schuler || Stephanie Blythe,Mark S. Doss
|-
|2002 || La clemenza di Tito || Wolfgang Amadeus Mozart || Italian || 1791 || || Chas Rader-Shieber || David Zinn,David Zinn,Rick Fisher || Joyce DiDonato,Alex Penda,Isabel Bayrakdarian,Kristine Jepson
|-
|2002 || La traviata || Verdi || Italian || 1853 || John Crosby || Bruce Donnell || Robert Perdziola,David Walker,Rick Fisher || Sondra Radvanovsky
|-
|2002 || L'amour de loin || Kaija Saariaho || French || 2000 || Robert Spano || Peter Sellars || George Tsypin,Martin Pakledinaz,James F. Ingalls || Dawn Upshaw,Monica Groop,Gerald Finley
|-
|2003 || La belle Hélène || Jacques Offenbach || French || 1864 || Kenneth Montgomery || Laurent Pelly || Chantal Thomas,Laurent Pelly,Duane Schuler || Barry Banks,Timothy Nolen,Susan Graham,William Burden
|-
|2003 || Così fan tutte || Wolfgang Amadeus Mozart || Italian || 1790 || Darik Knutsen || James Robinson || Allen Moyer,David C. Woolard,Duane Schuler || Ana María Martínez,Troy Cook,Patricia Risley,Charles Castronovo,Andrew Shore
|-
|2003 || Intermezzo || Richard Strauss || German || 1924 || Kenneth Montgomery || Ken Cazan || Carl Friedrich Oberle,Carl Friedrich Oberle,Rick Fisher || Judith Howarth,Scott Hendricks,Brandon Jovanovich,Mark Garrett
|-
|2003 || Káťa Kabanová || Leoš Janáček || Czech || 1921 || Steven Sloane/Robert Tweten || Jonathan Kent || Paul Brown,Paul Brown,Duane Schuler || Patricia Racette,Michael Smallwood,Judith Forst,Patricia Risley
|-
|2003 || Madame Mao || Bright Sheng || English || 2003 || John Fiore || Colin Graham || Neil Patel,David C. Woolard,Rick Fisher || Anna Christy,Alan Opie,Kelly Kaduce
|-
|2004 || Simon Boccanegra || Giuseppe Verdi || Italian || 1857 || Corrado Rovaris || Stefano Vizioli || Robert Innes Hopkins,Anna Marie Heinreich,Duane Schuler || Mark Delavan /Anthony Michaels-Moore,Patricia Racette,Marcus Haddock
|-
|2004 || Don Giovanni || Wolfgang Amadeus Mozart || Italian || 1787 || Alan Gilbert /Robert Tweten || Chas Rader-Shieber || David Zinn,David Zinn,Duane Schuler || Mariusz Kwiecień,Ana María Martínez,Kevin Short,
Christina Pier
|-
|2004 || Béatrice et Bénédict || Hector Berlioz || French || 1862 || Kenneth Montgomery || Tim Albery || Antony McDonald,Antony McDonald,Jennifer Tipton || Viktoria Vizin,William Burden,Celena Shafer,Jill Grove
|-
|2004 || Agrippina || George Frideric Handel || English || 1709 || Harry Bicket || Francisco Negrin || Allen Moyer,Allen Moyer,Jennifer Tipton || Christine Goerke,Kristine Jepson,Corey McKern,David Walker
|-
|2004 || La sonnambula || Vincenzo Bellini || English || 1831 || Evelilno Pido || Stephan Grogler || Veronique Seymat,Veronique Seymat,Rick Fisher || Natalie Dessay,Shalva Mukeria,Giovanni Furlanetto,Evelyn Pollock
|-
|2005 || Turandot || Puccini || Italian || 1926 || Alan Gilbert || Douglas Fitch || Douglas Fitch /Adam Stockhausen,Willa Kim,Duane Schuler || Jennifer Wilson,Carl Tanner /Dongwon Shin,Patricia Racette /Serena Farnocchia
|-
|2005 || The Barber of Seville || Gioachino Rossini || Italian || 1816 || Kenneth Montgomery || Stefano Vizioli || Riccardo Hernandez,Anna Marie Heinreich,Duane Schuler || Brian Leerhuber,Ana María Martínez,Bruce Sledge,Dale Travis
|-
|2005 || Lucio Silla || Wolfgang Amadeus Mozart || Italian || 1772 || Bernard Labadie || Jonathan Kent || Paul Brown,Paul Brown,Duane Schuler || Gregory Kunde,Susan Graham,Celena Shafer,Anna Christy
|-
|2005 || Peter Grimes || Benjamin Britten || English || 1945 || Alan Gilbert || Paul Curran || Robert Innes Hopkins,Robert Innes Hopkins,Rick Fisher || Anthony Dean Griffey,Wilbur Pauley,Christine Brewer,Alan Opie, Michael Langan
|-
|2005 || Ainadamar || Osvaldo Golijov || Spanish || 2003 || Miguel Harth-Bedoya || Peter Sellars || Gronk,Gabriel Berry,James F. Ingalls || Dawn Upshaw,Jessica Rivera, Kelley O'Connor
|-
|2006 || Carmen || Georges Bizet || French || 1874 || Alan Gilbert || Rudolfsson || Patel,Rudolfsson,Duane Schuler || Anne Sofie von Otter,Jennifer Black
|-
|2006 || The Magic Flute || Wolfgang Amadeus Mozart || German || 1791 || Lacey || Tim Albery || Hoheisel,Jennifer Tipton || Toby Spence,Susanna Phillips,Natalie Dessay
|-
|2006 || Cendrillon (Cinderella) || Jules Massenet || French || 1899 || Kenneth Montgomery || Laurent Pelly || Barbara de Limburg,Laurent Pelly,Duane Schuler || Joyce DiDonato,Richard Stilwell,Judith Forst,Eglise Gutierrez,Jennifer Holloway
|-
|2006 || Salome || Richard Strauss || German || 1905 || John Fiore || Bruce Donnell || Neil Patel,Neil Patel,Duane Schuler || Janice Watson,Ragnar Ulfung,Anne-Marie Owens,Dimitri Pittas,Greer Grimsley
|-
|2006 || The Tempest || Adès || English || 2004 || Alan Gilbert || Jonathan Kent || Paul Brown,Paul Brown,Duane Schuler || Rod Gilfry,Cyndia Sieden,Toby Spence,Chris Merritt,Gwynne Howell
|-
|2007 || La bohème || Giacomo Puccini || Italian || 1859 || Corrado Rovaris || Paul Curran || Kevin Knight,Kevin Knight,Rick Fisher || Gwyn Hughes Jones /Dimitri Pittas,Jennifer Black/Serena Farnocchia,Corey McKern /James Westman,Alexander Vinogradov,Nicole Cabell
|-
|2007 || Così fan tutte || Wolfgang Amadeus Mozart || Italian || 1790 || William Lacey || James Robinson || Allen Moyer,David C. Woolard,Duane Schuler || Norman Reinhardt,Mark Stone,Susanna Phillips,Katharine Goeldner,Dale Travis,Susanne Mentzer
|-
|2007 || Daphne || Richard Strauss || German || 1938 || Kenneth Montgomery || Mark Lamos || Allen Moyer,Joan Greenwood,Rick Fisher || Erin Wall,Garrett Sorenson,Scott MacAllister
|-
|2007 || Tea: A Mirror of Soul || Tan Dun || English || 2002 || Lawrence Renes || Amon Miyamoto || Rumi Matsui,Masatomo Ota,Rick Fisher || Nancy Maultsby,Kelly Kaduce,Christian Van Horn,Roger Honeywell
|-
|2007 || Platée || Jean-Philippe Rameau || Italian || 1745 || Harry Bicket || Laurent Pelly || Chantal Thomas,Laurent Pelly,Duane Schuler || Norman Reinhardt,Heidi Stober,Wilber Pauley,Ariana Chris,Jean-Paul Fouchécourt
|-
|2008 || Falstaff || Verdi || Italian || 1893 || Paolo Arrivabeni || Kevin Newbury || Allen Moyer,Clare Mitchell,Duane Schuler || Laurent Naouri /Anthony Michaels-Moore,Nancy Maultsby,Claire Rutter,Kelley O'Connor
|-
|2008 || The Marriage of Figaro || Mozart || Italian || 1786 || Kenneth Montgomery /Robert Tweten || Jonathan Kent || PaulBrown,Paul Brown,Duane Schuler || Luca Pisaroni,Susanna Phillips,Isabel Leonard,Mariusz Kwiecień
|-
|2008 || Billy Budd || Benjamin Britten || English || 1951 || Edo de Waart || Paul Curran || Robert I. Hopkins,Robert I. Hopkins,Rick Fisher || Teddy Tahu Rhodes,William Burden,Peter Rose,Richard Stilwell
|-
|2008 || Radamisto || George Frideric Handel || Italian || 1720 || Harry Bicket || David Alden || Gideon Davey,Gideon Davey,Rick Fisher || Laura Claycomb, David Daniels,Luca Pisaroni,Deborah Domanski,Laura Claycomb,Heidi Stober
|-
|2008 || Adriana Mater || Kaija Saariaho || French || 2006 || Ernest Martinez Izquierdo || Peter Sellars || George Tsypi, Martin Pakledinaz,James F. Ingalls || Monica Groop,Pia Freund,Joseph Kaiser,Matthew Best
|-
|2009 || La traviata || Giuseppe Verdi || Italian || 1853 || Frédéric Chaslin || Laurent Pelly || Chantal Thomas,Laurent Pelly,Duane Schuler || Natalie Dessay,Saimir Pirgu,Laurent Naouri /Anthony Michaels-Moore
|-
|2009 || The Elixir of Love || Gaetano Donizetti || Italian || 1832 || Corrado Rovaris || Stephen Lawless || Ashley Martin-Davis,Ashley Martin-Davis,Pat Collins || Jennifer Black,Dimitri Pittas,Patrick Carfizzi,Thomas Hammons
|-
|2009 || Don Giovanni || Wolfgang Amadeus Mozart || Italian || 1787 || Lawrence Renes || Chas Rader-Shieber || David Zinn,David Zinn,Japhy Weideman/orig: Duane Schuler || Lucas Meecham,Susanna Phillips,Kate Lindsey,Elza van den Heever
|-
|2009 || The Letter || Paul Moravec || English || 2009 || Patrick Summers || Jonathan Kent || Hildegard Bechtler,Tom Ford,Duane Schuler || Patricia Racette,Anthony Michaels-Moore,Roger Honeywell,James Maddalena
|-
|2009 || Alceste || Christoph Willibald Gluck || Italian || 1767 || Kenneth Montgomery || Francisco Negrin || Louis Désiré,Louis Désiré,Duane Schuler || Christine Brewer,Paul Groves,Paul Groves,Wayne Tigges
|-
|2010 || Madame Butterfly || Puccini || Italian || 1904 || Antony Walker || Lee Blakeley || Jean-Marc Puissant, Brigitte Reiffenstuel,Rick Fisher || Kelly Kaduce,Brandon Jovanovich,Elizabeth DeShong,James Westman
|-
|2010 || The Magic Flute || Mozart || German || 1791 || Lawrences Renes || Tim Albery || Tobias Hoheisel,Tobias Hoheisel,Jennifer Tipton || Charles Castronovo,Ekaterina Siurina,Erin Morley /Audrey Elizabeth Luna,Joshua Hopkins,Andrea Silvestrelli
|-
|2010 || The Tales of Hoffmann || Offenbach || French || 1881 || Stephen Lord || Christopher Alden || Allen Moyer,Constance Hoffman,Pat Collins || Erin Wall,Kate Lindsey,Paul Groves,Wayne Tigges
|-
|2010 || Life is a Dream || Lewis Spratlan || English || 2010 || Leonard Slatkin || Kevin Newbury || David Korins,Jessica Jahn, Japhy Weideman || Roger Honeywell,John Cheek,James Maddalena,Ellie Dehn
|-
|2010 || Albert Herring || Richard Strauss || German || 1947 || Andrew Davis || Paul Curran || Kevin Knight,Kevin Knight,Rick Fisher || Alek Shrader,Kate Lindsey,Celena Shafer,Christine Brewer,Joshua Hopkins
|-
|2011 || Faust || Charles Gounod || French || 1859 || Frédéric Chaslin  || Stephen Lawless || Benoit Dugardyn, Susan Wilmington,Pat Collins || Bryan Hymel,Mark S. Doss,Ailyn Pérez,Jamie Barton,Jennifer Holloway,Christopher Magiera
|-
|2011 || La bohème || Giacomo Puccini || Italian || 1859 || Leonardo Vordoni || Paul Curran || Kevin Knight,Kevin Knight,Rick Fisher || Ana María Martínez,David Lomeli,Heidi Stober,Corey McKern,Christian Van Horn
|-
|2011 || Griselda || Antonio Vivaldi || Italian || 1735 || Grant Gershon || Peter Sellars || Gronk, Dunya Ramicova,James F. Ingalls || Isabel LeonardMeredith Arwady,Paul Groves,David Daniels
|-
|2011 || The Last Savage || Gian Carlo Menotti || English || 1964 || George Manahan || Ned Canty || Allen Moyer,Allen Moyrer,Rick Fisher || Kevin Burdette,Jennifer Zetlan,Anna Christy,Jamie Barton,Daniel Okulitch
|-
|2011 || Wozzeck || Alban Berg || German || 1931 || David Robertson || Daniel Slater || Robert I. Hopkins,Robert I. Hopkins,Rick Fisher || Richard Paul Fink,Eric Owens,Nicola Beller Carbone,Patricia Risley
|-
|2012 || Tosca || Giacomo Puccini || Italian || 1900 || Frédéric Chaslin || Stephen Barlow || Yannis Thavoris,Yannis Thavoris,Duane Schuler || Amanda Eschalez,Raymond Aceto/Thomas Hampson,Brian Jagde
|-
|2012 || The Pearl Fishers || Georges Bizet || French || 1863 || Emmanuel Valaume || Lee Blakeley || Jean-Marc Pruissant,Brigitte Reiffenstuel,Rick Fisher || Nicole Cabell,Eric Cutler,Christopher Magiera,Wayne Tigges
|-
|2012 || Maometto II || Gioachino Rossini || Italian || 1820 || Frédéric Chaslin || David Alden || Jon Morrell,Jon Morelli,Peggy Hickey || Luca Pisaroni,Leah Crocetto,Patricia Bardon,Bruce Sledge
|-
|2012 || King Roger || Karol Szymanowski || Polish || 1926 || Evan Rogister || Stephen Wadsworth || Stephen Lynch,Ann Hould-Ward, Duane Schuler || Mariusz Kwiecień,Erin Morley,William Burden,Dennis Petersen,Raymond Aceto
|-
|2012 || Arabella || Richard Strauss || German || 1934 || Andrew Davis || Tim Albery || Tobias Hoheisel,Tobias Hoheisel,David Finn || Erin Wall,Heidi Stober,Mark Delavan,Dale Travis
|-
|2013 || The Grand Duchess of Gerolstein || Jacques Offenbach || French || 1867 || Emmanuel Villaume || Lee Blakeley || Adrian Linford,Jo van Schuppen,Rick Fisher || Susan Graham,Paul Appleby,Kevin Burdette,Ana Matanovič,Jonathan Michie,Aaron Pegram
|-
|2013 || The Marriage of Figaro || Wolfgang Amadeus Mozart || Italian || 1786 || John Nelson || Bruce Donnell /orig: Jonathan Kent || Paul Brown,Paul Brown,Duane Schuler || Zachary Nelson,Lisette Oropesa,Susanna Phillips,Emily Fons,Daniel Okulitch
|-
|2013 || La donna del lago || Gioachino Rossini || Italian || 1819 || Stephen Lord || Paul Curran || Kevin Knight,Kevin Knight,Duane Schuler || Joyce DiDonato,Lawrence Brownlee,Marianna Pizzolato,Wayne Tigges,René Barbera
|-
|2013 || La traviata || Giuseppe Verdi || Italian || 1853 || Leo Hussain || Laurent Pelly || Chantal Thomas,Laurent Pelly,Duane Schuler || Brenda Rae,Michael Fabiano,Roland Wood,Dale Travis
|-
|2013 || Oscar || Theodore Morrison || English || 2013 || Evan Rogister || Kevin Newbury || David Korins, David C. Woolard,Rick Fisher || David Daniels,Heidi Stober,William Burden,Dwayne Croft
|-
|2014 || Carmen || Bizet || French || 1874 || Rory Macdonald || Stephen Lawless || Benoit DugardynJorge JaraPat Collins || Daniela Mack /Ana María MartínezRoberto De Biasio,Joyce El-Khoury
|-
|2014 || Don Pasquale || Donizetti || Italian || 1843 || Corrado Rovaris || Laurent Pelly || Laurent PellyChantal ThomasDuane Schuler || Andrew Shore,Brenda Rae,Shelly Jackson,Alek Shrader
|-
|2014 || Fidelio || Beethoven || German || 1804 || Harry Bicket || Stephen Wadsworth || Charlie Corcoran,Camille Assaf,Duane Schuler || Paul Groves,Alex Penda,Greer Grimsley,Manfred Hemm
|-
|2014 || The Impresario ||Mozart || English || 1786 || Kenneth Montgomery || Michael Gieleta || James MacnamaraFabio TobliniChristopher Akerlind || Erin Morley,Brenda Rae,Bruce Sledge,Anthony Michaels-Moore
|-
|2014 || The Nightingale || Stravinsky || Russian || 1914 || Kenneth Montgomery || Michael Gieleta || James Macnamara,Fabio Toblini,Christopher Akerlind || Erin Morley,Brenda Rae,Bruce Sledge,
|-
|2014 || Dr. Sun Yat-sen || Huang Ruo || Mandarin Chinese || 2012 || Carolyn Kuan || James Robinson || Allen Moyer,James Schuette,Christopher Akerlind || Joseph Dennis,Corinne Winters,MaryAnn McCormick,Don-Jian Gong,Chen Ye Yuan
|-
|2015 || La fille du régiment || Donizetti || French || 1840 || Speranza Scappucci || Ned Canty || Allen Moyer || Anna Christy,Judith Christin,Alek Shrader,Kevin Burdette
|-
|2015 || Rigoletto || Verdi || Italian || 1851 || Jader Bignamini || Lee Blakeley || Adrian Linford || Quinn Kelsey,Bruce Sledge,Georgia Jarman,Nicole Piccolomini
|-
|2015 || La finta giardiniera || Mozart || Italian || 1775 || || || || Heidi Stober,Susanna Phillips,Joel Prieto,Joshua Hopkins,Cecelia Hall
|-
|2015 || Salome || Richard Strauss || German || 1905 || David Robertson || Daniel Slater || Leslie Travers || Alex Penda,Robert Brubaker,Ryan McKinny,Michaela Martens
|-
|2015 || Cold Mountain  || Jennifer Higdon || English || 2015 || Miguel Harth-Bedoya || Leonard Foglia || Robert Brill, David C. Woolard, Elaine J. McCarthy || Isabel Leonard,Nathan Gunn,Emily Fons,Jay Hunter Morris,Kevin Burdette,Anthony Michaels-Moore
|-
|2016 || La fanciulla del West || Giacomo Puccini || Italian || 1910 || Emmanuel Villaume || Richard Jones || Nicky Gillibrand,Mimi Jordan Sherin || Patricia Racette,Gwyn Hughes Jones,Mark Delavan
|-
|2016 || Don Giovanni || Wolfgang Amadeus Mozart || Italian || 1787 || John Nelson || Ron Daniels || Riccardo Hernandez,Emily Rebholz,Marcus Doshi || Daniel Okulitch,Leah Crocetto,Keri Algema, Rihan Lois, Edgaras Montvidas, Kyle Ketelsen
|-
|2016 || Roméo et Juliette || Charles Gounod || French || 1859 || Harry Bicket || Stephen Lawless || Ashley Martin-Davis,Mimi Jordan Sherin || Stephen Costello,Ailyn Pérez,Emily Fons,Elliot Madore, Raymond Aceto
|-
|2016 || Capriccio || Richard Strauss || German || 1942 || Leo Hussain || Tim Albery || Tobias Hoheisel, Malcolm Rippeth || Susan Graham,Amanda Majeski,Craig Verm, Ben Bliss, Joshua Hopkins
|-
|2016 || Vanessa || Samuel Barber || English || 1958 || Leonard Slatkin || James Robinson || Allen Moyer,James Schuette,Christopher Akerlind || James Morris,Erin Wall,Virginie Verrez,Zach Borichevsky, Helene Schneiderman 
|-
|2017 || Die Fledermaus || Johann Strauss II || German || 1874 || Nicholas Carter || Ned Canty || Allen Moyer,Christianne Myers,Duane Schuler || Susan Graham, Paula Murrihy,Kurt Streit, Devon Guthrie,David Goversten, Dimitry Pittas
|-
|2017 || Lucia di Lammermoor || Gaetano Donizetti || Italian || 1835 || Corrado Rovaris || Ron Daniels || Riccardo Hernandez,Emily Rebholz,Peter Nigrini || Brenda Rae, Mario Chang, Zachary Nelson, Christian Van Horn 
|-
|2017 || Alcina || George Frideric Handel || Italian || 1728 || Harry Bicket || David Alden || Gideon Davey,Malcolm Rippeth, || Elza van den Heever, Anna Christy, Paula Murrihy, Daniela Mack, Alek Shrader, Christian Van Horn, Jacquelyn Stucker
|-
|2017 || The Golden Cockerel || Nikolai Rimsky-Korsakov || Russian || 1834 || Emmanuel Villaume || Paul Curran || Gary Mccann,Paul HackenMueller, || Venera Gimadieva, Tim Mix, Barry Banks, Kevin Burdette, Meredith Arwady
|-
|2017 || The (R)evolution of Steve Jobs || Mason Bates || English || 2017 || Michael Christie || Kevin Newbury || Vita Tzykun, Paul Carey || Edward Parks, Sasha Cooke, Wei Wu, Kelly Markgraf, Garrett Sorenson 
|-
|2018 || Candide || Leonard Bernstein || English || 1956 || Harry Bicket || Laurent Pelly || Chantal Thomas,Duane Schuler || Brenda Rae, Alek Shrader, Kevin Burdette
|-
|2018 || Madame Butterfly || Giacomo Puccini || Italian || 1904 || John Fiore || Matthew Ozawa || Jean-Marc Puissant,Bridgitte Reiffenstuel ,Rick Fisher || Ana María Martínez, Kelly Kaduce, A.J. Glueckert, Joshua Guerrero
|-
|2018 || Doctor Atomic || John Adams || English || 2005 || Matthew Aucoin || Peter Sellars || David Gropman,Gabriel Berry ,Emily Johnshon || Ryan Mickinny, Julia Bullock Kitty, Ben Bliss, Meredith Arway Pasqualita, Daniel Okulitch
|-
|2018 || The Italian Girl in Algiers || Gioachino Rossini || Italian || 1813 || Corrado Rovaris || Shawna Lucey || Robert Innes Hopkins,David C. Woolard,Duane Schuler || Daniela Mack,Jack Swanson,Scott Conner,Suzanne Hendrix Zulma
|-
|2018 || Ariadne auf Naxos || Richard Strauss || German || 1916 || James Gaffigan || Time Albery || Tobias Hoheisel,Thomas Hase || Amanda Echalaz,Bruce Sledge,Liv Redpath,Amanda Majeski, Kevin Burdette
|-
|2019 || La bohème || Giacomo Puccini || Italian || 1859 || Jader Bignamini || Mary Birnbaum || Grace Laubacher,Camellia Koo,Anshuman Bhatia || Vanessa Vasquez,Gabriella Reyes,Mario Chang,Zachery Nelson,Will Liverman, Soloman Howard
|-
|2019 || Così fan tutte || Wolfgang Amadeus Mozart || Italian || 1790 || Harry Bicket || R. B. Schlather || Paul Tate Depoo,Terese Wadden,Jax Messenger || Amanda Majeski,Emily D'Angelo,Tracy Dahl,Ben Bliss,Jarrett Ott,Rod Gilfry
|-
|2019 || The Pearl Fishers || Georges Bizet || French || 1863 || Timothy Myers || Shawna Lucey || Jean-Marc Pruissant,Brigitte Reiffenstuel,Rick Fisher || Corinne Winters,Ilker Arayurek,Anthony Clack Evans,Robert Pomakov
|-
|2019 || Jenůfa || Leoš Janáček || Czech || 1904 || Johannes Debus || David Alden || Charles Edwards,Jon Morrell,Duane Schuler || Laura Wilde,Patricia Racette,Susanne Mentzer,Alexander Lewis,Laca Klemen,Richard Trey Smagur
|-
|2019 || The Thirteenth Child || Poul Ruders || English || 2019 || Paul Daniel || Darko Tresnjak || Alexander Dodge,Rita Ryack,York Kennedy || Jessica E. Jones, Tamara Mumford, Joshua Dennis,Bardley Garvin, David Leigh
|-
|2020 || The Barber of Seville || Gioachino Rossini || Italian || 1816 || - || - || - || Cancelled
|-
|2020 || The Magic Flute || Wolfgang Amadeus Mozart || German || 1791 || - || - || - || Cancelled
|-
|2020 || Rusalka || Antonín Dvořák || Czech || 1901 || - || - || - || Cancelled
|-
|2020 || Tristan und Isolde || Richard Wagner || German || 1865 || - || - || - || Cancelled
|-
|2020 || M. Butterfly || David Henry Hwang || English || 2020 || - || - || - || Cancelled
|-
|2021 || The Marriage of Figaro || Wolfgang Amadeus Mozart || Italian || 1786 || Harry Bicket || Laurie Feldman || Chantal Thomas || Nicholas Brownlee,Ting Fang,Patrick Carfizzi, Susanne Mentzer,Megan Marino,Samual Dale Johnson
|-
|2021 || Lord of the Cries || John Corigliano || English || 2021 || Johannes Debus || James Darrah || Chrisi Karvonides-Dushenko || Anthony Roth Costanzo,Kevin Burdette,Leah Brzyski,Rachel Blaustein,Susanna Phillips
|-
|2021 || Eugene Onegin || Pyotr Ilyich Tchaikovsky || Russian || 1879 || Nicholas Carter || Alessandro Talevi || Gary Mccann || Sara Jakubiak,Avery Ameraeu,Lucas Meachem,Dovlet Nurgeldiyev
|-
|2021 || A Midsummer Night's Dream || Benjamin Britten || English || 1960 || Harry Bicket || Netia Jones || D.M.Wood || Erin Morley,Kevin Burdette,Nicholas Brownlee,Brenton Ryan,Reed Luplau
|-
|2022 || Carmen || Georges Bizet || French || 1874 || Harry Bicket || Mariame Clement || Julia Hansen || Isabel Leonard,Bryan Hymel,Michael Fabiano,Michael Sumuel,Sylvia DEramo,David Crawford
|-
|2022 || Tristan und Isolde || Richard Wagner || German || 1865 || James Gaffigan || Zack Winokur || Lisenka Heijboer Castanon || Simon O'Neill,Tamara Wilson,Jamie Barton,Nicholas Brownlee,Eric Owens,David Leigh
|-
|2022 || The Barber of Seville || Gioachino Rossini || Italian || 1816 || Ivan Lopez-Reynoso || Stephen Barlow || Andrew Edwards || Emily Fons,Jack Swanson,Joshua Hopkins,Kevin Burdette,Ryan Speedo Green
|-
|2022 || Falstaff || Giuseppe Verdi || Italian || 1893 || Paul Daniel || David McVicar || Lizzie Powell || Quinn Kelsey,Alexandra loBianco,Roland Wood,Elena Villalon,Eric Ferring,Ann Quintero
|-
|2022 || M. Butterfly || David Henry Hwang || English || 2020 || Carolyn Kuan || James Robinson || Kangmin Justin Kim || Kangmin Justin Kim,Mark Stone,Hongni Wu,Kevin Burdette,Joshua Dennis 
|-
|}

References
Notes

Sources
 
 "The Repertory", The Santa Fe Opera 2013 Season (programme book), pp. 146–49.
 
 Unk.(1983), 
 Unk. (2003), The Santa Fe Opera − Miracle in the Desert'', Santa Fe: The Santa Fe Opera, 2003.

Online sources
 The Santa Fe Opera's "Opera Archives": Search by Title or Composer or Season: 1957 forward

External links
 Official website of The Santa Fe Opera
 Official website of The Guilds of The Santa Fe Opera, Inc.

Opera-related lists